Farrokhzad (also Romanized as Farrokhzād and Farokhzād) is a village in Almahdi Rural District of Mohammadyar District of Naqadeh County, West Azerbaijan province, Iran. At the 2006 National Census, its population was 1,077 in 264 households. The following census in 2011 counted 995 people in 284 households. The latest census in 2016 showed a population of 887 people in 275 households; it was the largest village in its rural district.

References 

Naqadeh County

Populated places in West Azerbaijan Province

Populated places in Naqadeh County